John Torr (1813 – 16 January 1880) was a Conservative Party politician.

He was elected Conservative MP for Liverpool at a by-election in 1873 and held the seat until his death shortly before the next general election in 1880.

References

External links
 

1813 births
1880 deaths
Conservative Party (UK) MPs for English constituencies
UK MPs 1868–1874
UK MPs 1874–1880
Members of the Parliament of the United Kingdom for Liverpool